Rajnish Kumar is an Indian banker. He held the position of Chairman of the State Bank of India.

He joined SBI as a Probationary officer in 1980. He has served as Managing Director (National Banking Group), a position he was given on 2 November 2015 and the Managing Director (Compliance & Risk) of SBI. He  also cracked the Certified Associate of Indian Institute of Bankers of Indian Institute of Banking and Finance. The senior bank official previously also headed the SBI Capital Markets Limited (the Merchant Banking arm of State Bank of India) as Managing Director and Chief Executive Officer, prior to becoming Managing Director in SBI

Competence
O. P. Bhatt lauded Kumar's experience in the corporate banking and international banking divisions of State Bank of India. Laying out his agenda Rajnish Kumar said,
NPA management has been one of the biggest agendas being pursued by Mrs Bhattacharya. We will continue that agenda. The bank is already in the midst of a digital transformation, which in itself is a big change. The market is also very competitive and we will have to be on our toes in this matter.

References

 Forbes.

Indian bankers
Living people
1958 births
Businesspeople from Mumbai